Igor Sijsling won the title, defeating Mirza Bašić in the final 6–4, 6–4 .

Seeds

Draw

Finals

Top half

Bottom half

References
 Main Draw
 Qualifying Draw

2015 ATP Challenger Tour
2015